Leopoldo Sánchez Cruz (born 22 July 1971) is a Mexican politician affiliated with the PRI. As of 2013 he served as Deputy of the LXII Legislature of the Mexican Congress representing Veracruz.

References

1971 births
Living people
Politicians from Veracruz
Institutional Revolutionary Party politicians
21st-century Mexican politicians
Deputies of the LXII Legislature of Mexico
Members of the Chamber of Deputies (Mexico) for Veracruz